Annona cacans, with the common names: Araticum-cagão, Araticum de paca, Araticum-pacarí, is a fruit tree native to Atlantic Forest and Cerrado vegetation in Brazil and Paraguay.

Description
This tree is among the largest in the genus Annona. It usually grows .

The fruit's succulent clear or white flesh is edible with a sweet or bitter flavor. It cannot be eaten in large amounts due to the laxative properties. They are also a food source of the paca.  Its pollen is shed as permanent tetrads.

References

External links
 Useful Tropical Plants website
 Colecionadores de Frutas website

cacans
Trees of Brazil
Trees of Paraguay
Endangered plants
Endangered biota of South America